Hudson Whittaker (born Hudson Woodbridge; January 8, 1903March 19, 1981), known as Tampa Red, was a Chicago blues musician.

His  distinctive single-string slide guitar style, songwriting and bottleneck technique influenced other Chicago blues guitarists such as Big Bill Broonzy, Robert Nighthawk, Muddy Waters, Elmore James and Mose Allison. In a career spanning over 30 years, he also recorded pop, R&B and hokum songs. His best-known recordings include "Anna Lou Blues", "Black Angel Blues", "Crying Won't Help You", "It Hurts Me Too", and "Love Her with a Feeling".

Biography

Early life
Tampa Red was born Hudson Woodbridge in Smithville, Georgia. The date of his birth is uncertain, with Tampa himself giving years varying from 1900 to 1908. The birth date given on his death certificate is January 8, 1904. His parents, John and Elizabeth Woodbridge, died when he was a child, and he moved to Tampa, Florida, where he was raised by his aunt and grandmother and adopted their surname, Whittaker. He emulated his older brother, Eddie, who played the guitar around the Tampa area, and he was especially inspired by an old street musician called Piccolo Pete, who first taught him to play blues licks on the guitar. Red also picked up some knowledge from early recordings of female blues singers like Ma Rainey, Bessie Smith, and Ida Cox. In an interview with Martin Williams, Red told Williams "That [1920] record of "Crazy Blues" by Mamie Smith, it was one of the first blues records ever made. I said to myself, 'I don't know any music, but I can play that.'"

Career
By 1925, having already perfected his slide technique, he had moved to Chicago, Illinois, and began his career as a street musician, adopting the name "Tampa Red", with reference to his childhood home and his light-colored skin. His big break came when he was hired to accompany Ma Rainey. While in Chicago, he met Thomas A. Dorsey, also known as Georgia Tom. Dorsey was an accomplished pianist, composer, and arranger who had performed and recorded with the leading female blues singers of the era, in particular Ma Rainey. It was Dorsey who introduced Red to J. Mayo Williams, the frontman for Paramount Records in Chicago. Williams arranged a recording session for Red, and he began recording in 1928, with "Through Train Blues", although it did not have as much success since it shared the record with Paramount's biggest star at the time, Blind Lemon Jefferson.

However, it was Red's second record, "It's Tight Like That", that caused a national sensation. The song reportedly came about when Mayo Williams heard them playing with a tune, borrowed from a Charley Jordan song, built around the then-popular catch phrase, "Tight Like That." Williams loved it and insisted they record it right away. Played in a bawdy and humorous style that became known as hokum, it ended up selling one million copies. Red would later recall people standing outside of record stores waiting to buy it. Since the song was composed by both Red and Dorsey, they shared around $4,000 in royalties from the song. 

Much of Tampa Red's early recordings were mostly collaborations with Dorsey. The two recorded almost 90 sides, sometimes as the Hokum Boys or, with Frankie Jaxon, as Tampa Red's Hokum Jug Band. In 1928 and 1929, besides making their own records, he and Georgia Tom appeared on recordings by Ma Rainey, Madilyn Davis, Lil Johnson, and female impersonator Frankie "Half Pint" Jaxon.

In 1928, Red became the first black musician to play a National steel-bodied resonator guitar , the loudest and showiest guitar available before amplification, acquiring one in the first year in which they were available. This allowed him to develop his trademark bottleneck style, playing single-string runs, not block chords, which was a precursor of later blues and rock guitar soloing. The National guitar he used was a gold-plated tricone, which was found in Illinois in the 1990s by Randy Clemens, a music shop owner and guitarist, and later sold to the Experience Music Project in Seattle. Red was known as "The Man with the Gold Guitar", and into the 1930s he was billed as "The Guitar Wizard". In 1931, Red recorded "Depression Blues", including the topical lyrics, "If I could tell my troubles, it would give my poor heart ease, but Depression has got me, somebody help me please".

Red's partnership with Dorsey ended in 1932, but he remained much in demand as a session musician, working with John Lee "Sonny Boy" Williamson, Memphis Minnie, Big Maceo, and many others. He signed with Victor Records in 1934 and remained on their artist roster until 1953. He formed the Chicago Five,  a group of session musicians who created what became known as the Bluebird sound, a precursor of the small-group style of later jump blues and rock-and-roll bands. Red was a friend and associate of Big Bill Broonzy and Big Maceo Merriweather. He achieved commercial success and some prosperity. His home became a centre for the blues community, providing rehearsal space, bookings, and lodgings for musicians who arrived in Chicago from the Mississippi Delta as the commercial potential of blues music grew and agricultural employment in the South diminished.

By the 1940s, Red was playing an electric guitar. In 1942, his "Let Me Play with Your Poodle", was a number 4 hit on Billboards new "Harlem Hit Parade", a forerunner of the R&B chart. His 1949 recording "When Things Go Wrong with You (It Hurts Me Too)", another R&B hit, was covered by Elmore James.

He was "rediscovered" in the blues revival of the late 1950s, like many other surviving early-recorded blues artists, such as Son House and Skip James. He made his last recordings in 1960.

Later life
Red's wife, Frances Whittaker, died on November 21, 1953. The loss was reportedly a great blow to him, and he became an alcoholic. When blues expert Jim O'Neal discovered him on Chicago's South Side in 1974, he was living with his female companion, 81-year-old Effie Tolbert. Red was reportedly in a much worse shape than in his earlier years, and his electric guitar rested under a bed while his National steel guitar had been stolen (it was recovered in a pawn shop in 1994, and eventually sold to the Experience Music Project in Seattle for $85,000).

Tolbert died on December 10 1974, and accounts of Red's past mental problems discouraged friends from taking him into their homes. By January 1975, he was at a state hospital in Chicago.

Death
Red lived out his final years in Central Nursing Home, where he died from a heart attack while eating breakfast on the morning of March 19, 1981. According to a newspaper obituary published by Jim O'Neal, his funeral was held at Biggs & Biggs Funeral Home, and he was buried in Mount Glenwood Memory Garden, in the Chicago suburb of Willow Springs.

Discography
Red was one of the most prolific blues recording artists of his era. It has been estimated that he recorded 335 songs on 78-rpm records, of which 251 were recorded between 1928 and 1942, making him the blues artist with the most recordings during that period. Most of his singles were released before Billboard magazine began tracking blues (and other "race music") in October 1942, and accurate sales records are not available. However, he had four singles that placed in the R&B top ten between 1942 and 1951.

Selected singles
Red recorded alternate versions (usually designated "No. 2", "No. 3", etc.) of some of his early songs. Songs with alternate versions are marked with a superscript plus sign. He recorded some singles with collaborators, credited as the Hokum Boys, Tampa Red's Hokum Jug Band, Papa Too Sweet, and other names. 

He also played as a sideman on recordings by Big Maceo Merriweather, John Lee "Sonny Boy" Williamson, Memphis Minnie, Ma Rainey, and Victoria Spivey.

Selected albums
Although he was a prolific singles artist, Red recorded only two albums, which were released late in his career. Various compilation albums have been released since his death by different record companies, often with significant overlap, but some compilations focus on certain aspects of his style or original record labels.

References

External links

[ AllMusic biography]
Entry in the New Georgia Encyclopedia
Big Bands Database Plus "Tampa Red's Hokum Jug Band"
National Reso-phonic Guitar History
E-notes biography
http://www.bluesoterica.com/the-tampa-red-page
 Tampa Red recordings at the Discography of American Historical Recordings.

1903 births
1981 deaths
People from Lee County, Georgia
African-American guitarists
African-American male singer-songwriters
American blues guitarists
American male guitarists
American blues singers
Slide guitarists
Chicago blues musicians
RCA Victor artists
Bluebird Records artists
Vocalion Records artists
American blues pianists
American male pianists
20th-century American guitarists
Musicians from Tampa, Florida
Guitarists from Florida
Guitarists from Illinois
Guitarists from Georgia (U.S. state)
20th-century American pianists
20th-century African-American male singers
Singer-songwriters from Georgia (U.S. state)
Singer-songwriters from Illinois
Singer-songwriters from Florida